Tomasz Mariusz Rząsa (born 11 March 1973) is a Polish former professional footballer who primarily played as a left back and sometimes as a left midfielder.

Club career
During his career, Rząsa represented Cracovia and Sokół Pniewy (pl) (Poland), Grasshoppers (Switzerland), Lugano (Switzerland), Young Boys (Switzerland), De Graafschap (Netherlands), Feyenoord (Netherlands), Partizan (Serbia), Heerenveen (Netherlands), ADO Den Haag (Netherlands) and Ried (Austria).

While playing with Grasshoppers, he won two Swiss National League championships, in 1994–95 and 1995–96 seasons.

He played for Feyenoord between 1999 and 2003, where he failed to win any domestic title with the club, but did win the 2001–02 UEFA Cup, by beating Borussia Dortmund in the final. Consequently, they played the 2002 UEFA Super Cup, but lost against Real Madrid. Rząsa played both finals.

With Partizan, he was the newcomer alongside Ljubinko Drulović, Taribo West and others, where he helped the club reach the Champions League group stage.

In 2006, he came to Austria and signed with SV Ried, where he was decisive in helping them to achieve their greatest ever result – finishing as runners-up in the 2006–07 Austrian Bundesliga. He played an impressive 58 league matches in just two seasons with Ried.

International career
Rząsa represented Poland in 36 international matches between 1994 and 2006, and scored one goal.

He was part of the Polish team at the 2002 FIFA World Cup.

Coaching career
Upon finishing his playing career, he was an assistant manager at Lech Poznań under Maciej Skorża during the 2014–15 season, and under Rafał Ulatowski in May 2018.

Career statistics
Scores and results list Poland's goal tally first, score column indicates score after each Rząsa goal.

Honours
Grasshoppers
Swiss Super League: 1995–96, 1996–97

Feyenoord
Johan Cruijff Shield: 1999
UEFA Cup: 2001–02

References

External links

 
 
 

1973 births
Living people
Footballers from Kraków
Polish footballers
Association football fullbacks
Poland international footballers
Poland youth international footballers
Poland under-21 international footballers
UEFA Cup winning players
2002 FIFA World Cup players
MKS Cracovia (football) players
Sokół Pniewy players
Grasshopper Club Zürich players
FC Lugano players
BSC Young Boys players
De Graafschap players
Feyenoord players
FK Partizan players
SC Heerenveen players
ADO Den Haag players
SV Ried players
II liga players
I liga players
Ekstraklasa players
Swiss Super League players
Eredivisie players
First League of Serbia and Montenegro players
Austrian Football Bundesliga players
Polish expatriate footballers
Polish expatriate sportspeople in Switzerland
Expatriate footballers in Switzerland
Polish expatriate sportspeople in the Netherlands
Expatriate footballers in the Netherlands
Expatriate footballers in Serbia and Montenegro
Polish expatriate sportspeople in Austria
Expatriate footballers in Austria